The Competition Act is a Canadian federal law governing competition law in Canada. The Act contains both criminal and civil provisions aimed at preventing anti-competitive practices in the marketplace. The Act is enforced and administered by the Competition Bureau, and cases are adjudicated by the Competition Tribunal.

History 
The first legislation in Canada dealing with competition was first introduced in 1889. The legislation prohibited conspiracies and agreements by businesses in restraint of trade. Inspired by the American Sherman Antitrust Act, the legislation was mostly incorporated into the Canadian Criminal Code two years later. In 1912, the Supreme Court of Canada ruled that the purpose of the legislation was protect the public interest in free competition. The provisions remained in the Criminal Code until 1960, when the federal government introduced the Combines Investigation Act.

In 1986, the legislation was again amended and renamed the Competition Act by the conservative government of Brian Mulroney.

Administration 
The administration and enforcement of the Competition Act is done by the Competition Bureau, which is also responsible for the administration and enforcement of the Consumer Packaging and Labelling Act, the Textile Labelling Act and the Precious Metals Marking Act.

Competition Tribunal 
The Competition Tribunal is a specialized administrative body that has exclusive jurisdiction to hear certain competition matters.

See also
Competition Bureau
Competition Act 1998 - UK

References

External links
 

Canadian federal legislation
Competition law
1986 in Canadian law